2,4,6-Tri-tert-butylphenol (2,4,6-TTBP) is a phenol symmetrically substituted with three tert-butyl groups and thus strongly sterically hindered. 2,4,6-TTBP is a readily oxidizable aromatic compound and a weak acid. It oxidizes to give the deep-blue 2,4,6-tri-tert-butylphenoxy radical.  2,4,6-TTBP is related to 2,6-di-tert-butylphenol, which is widely used as an antioxidant in industrial applications.  These compounds are colorless solids.

Preparation 
The preparation of 2,4,6-tri-tert-butylphenol has been studied extensively. As early as 1890, Wilhelm Koenigs described the acid-catalyzed reaction of phenol with isobutylene.  Many other reports have appeared.  Yields up to 90%  have been reported. Typical side products are the result of incomplete alkylation: 4-tert-butylphenol (4-TBP), 2,4-di-tert-butylphenol (2,4-DTBP), 2,6-di-tert-butylphenol (2,6-DTBP). 2,5-Di-tert-butylphenol (2,5-DTB) has been observed. 2,4,6-tri-tert-butylphenol is also found as a by-product in the synthesis of the disubstitution products 2,4-DTBP and 2,6-DTBP, which are more widely used antioxidants.

A synthesis of 2,4,6-tri-tert-butylphenol has been described that is also suitable as a teaching experiment.  Methyl tert-butyl ether is used as the alkylating agent and sulfuric acid as catalyst. 2,4,6-TTBP is being obtained in 69% yield.

Properties 
2,4,6-Tri-tert-butylphenol is a white solid which dissolves in many organic solvents, but not in aqueous or alcoholic alkaline solutions. The green-blue coloring with iron(III)chloride, which is characteristic for phenols, does not occur in 2,4,6-TTBP. The compound is oxidizable in air but practically non-biodegradable.

As an electron-rich aromatic, 2,4,6-tri-tert-butylphenol can also be easily oxidized electrochemically. In the alkaline, the phenolate anion formed is first oxidized in a reversible reaction to the phenoxy radical. The stable radical is oxidized by further electron withdrawal to the phenoxonium cation, which reacts in water to give 2,4,6-tri-tert-butyl-4-hydroxy-2,5-cyclohexadienone.

In acidic media, the hydroxydienone is dealkylated with the cleavage of the tert-butyl group in the 4-position to the 2,6-di-tert-butylhydroquinone, which is oxidized to the end product 2,6-di-tert-butyl-1,4-benzoquinone.

The oxidation of 2,4,6-tri-tert-butylphenol in the alkaline to the intensely blue-colored phenoxy radical can also occur with potassium ferricyanide. The 2,4,6-tri-tert-butylphenoxy radical forms blue crystals on cooling to -70 °C which are stable at room temperature for several weeks and only gradually turn yellow. The phenoxy radical reacts with oxygen as a diradical to form a 4,4'-linked peroxide forming yellow crystals.

Applications 
The electron-rich 2,4,6-tri-tert-butylphenol can easily be oxidized to the phenoxy radical, which in the 4-position adds phenols, as well as alcohols and thiols to the corresponding cyclohexadienones.

The reaction can be used for the synthesis of 2,6-di-tert-butyl-4-methoxyphenol, which is frequently used as an antioxidant.

2,4,6-TTBP is used as stabilizers, free-radical scavengers and antioxidants in technical applications, such as in fuels, hydraulic fluids and lubricating oils, as well as in elastomeric and thermoplastic polymers. Because of its pronounced persistence, its high tendency for bioaccumulation and aquatic toxicity, 2,4,6-TTBP is only of low industrial use and is even forbidden, for example, in Japan.

The phenoxy radical of 2,4,6-TTBP is also described as a sterically demanding protecting group in a reagent for the transfer of a nucleophilic dimethylaminomethyl group [(CH3)2-N-CH2-] to form tertiary amines.

References 

Alkylphenols
Tert-butyl compounds